Chelouche is a surname. Notable people with the surname include:

Aharon Chelouche, co-founder of Neve Tzedek, now part of Tel Aviv
, Israeli diplomat
Moshe Chelouche, Mayor of Tel Aviv
Yoav Chelouche, Israeli businessman
Yosef Eliyahu Chelouche, co-founder of Tel Aviv, entrepreneur, businessman and industrialist

Maghrebi Jewish surnames
Surnames of Algerian origin